Zelinkaderes is a genus of worms belonging to the family Zelinkaderidae.

The species of this genus are found in North America, Japan.

Species:

Zelinkaderes brightae 
Zelinkaderes floridensis 
Zelinkaderes klepali 
Zelinkaderes submersus 
Zelinkaderes yong

References

Kinorhyncha